Gao Lundong (born April 18, 1960) is a Chinese sprint canoeist who competed in the mid-1980s. At the 1984 Summer Olympics in Los Angeles, he was eliminated in the repechages of the K-2 500 m event.

References

1960 births
Living people
People from Taizhou, Zhejiang
Sportspeople from Zhejiang
Olympic canoeists of China
Canoeists at the 1984 Summer Olympics
Chinese male canoeists